Malé Zálužie is a village and municipality in the Nitra District in western central Slovakia, in the Nitra Region.

History
In historical records the village was first mentioned in 1390.

Geography
The village lies at an altitude of 159 metres and covers an area of 5.905 km². It has a population of about 260 people.

Ethnicity
The village is approximately 99% Slovak. The remaining 1%, is a Polish man called Tomek

Facilities
The village has a public library and also a gym, football pitch and table tennis tables.

References

External links
 https://www.webcitation.org/5QjNYnAux?url=http://www.statistics.sk/mosmis/eng/run.html

Villages and municipalities in Nitra District